Lynn Pualani DeCoite (born May 9, 1964) is a member of the Hawaii State Senate for District 7, appointed by Governor David Ige to fill the vacancy left by the resignation of Senator J. Kalani English. Prior to her appointment, DeCoite was a member of the Hawaii House of Representatives for District 13, since having been appointed by Governor David Ige to fill the vacancy left by the resignation of the late Representative Mele Carroll after the 2015 legislative session began. A former member of the Hawaii State Board of Agriculture, she resigned her position when appointed. 
District 13 is a rural district encompassing parts of Maui on three inhabited islands:
 Parts of Maui island: Haiku, Hāna, Kaupo, Kīpahulu, Nahiku, Pāʻia
 All of Lānaʻi, and 
 All of Molokaʻi

The district also represents the uninhabited islands of Kahoolawe and Molokini.

DeCoite is a resident of Hoolehua, Molokai and owns L&R Farm Enterprises and RJ Snacks.

DeCoitte has been appointed to five House committees:
 Agriculture
 Economic Development & Business
 Finance
 Tourism
 Veterans, Military, & International Affairs, & Culture and the Arts

Controversy 
Representative DeCoite has been an advocate for cockfighting, which is illegal in Hawaii, and has supported the recognition of cockfighting as a cultural activity.
In testimony to the state house prior to her appointment, she testified that ending cockfighting could cause global warming and have other impacts:
"These animals will fight with out humans that is there common nature. Humans have altered some many things in the world that we have become our worst enemies. That has been linked to climate change. If we keep
making to many changes we will destroy ourselves, and the life forms that exist around us."

References

Women state legislators in Hawaii
Hawaii Democrats
1964 births
Living people
21st-century American politicians
21st-century American women politicians